The brown-banded antpitta (Grallaria milleri) is a species of bird in the family Grallariidae. It is endemic to Colombia.

Its natural habitats are subtropical or tropical moist montane forest and plantations. It is threatened by habitat loss.

References

External links
BirdLife Species Factsheet.

brown-banded antpitta
Birds of the Colombian Andes
Endemic birds of Colombia
brown-banded antpitta
Taxonomy articles created by Polbot